Yellow lizard may refer to:

Moorea
Yellow Monitor
Yellow-spotted tropical night lizard
Yellow-throated Plated Lizard

Animal common name disambiguation pages